Isanaklesh Peaks, formerly known as Squaw Tits is a summit in Maricopa County, Arizona, in the United States. with an elevation of .

The peak was named from its resemblance to a human breast. However, the term squaw is a derogatory racial epithet targeting the Indigenous people of North America, and Indigenous women in particular.

See also
 Breast-shaped hill
 Grand Tetons

References

Landforms of Maricopa County, Arizona
Mountains of Arizona
Mountains of Maricopa County, Arizona